Blood Blockade Battlefront is an anime television series based on the manga series of the same title written and illustrated by Yasuhiro Nightow. The series first season premiered on April 4, 2015 and ended on October 3, 2015 due to the final episode exceeding the length of its normal 30 minute timeslot as its original airdate was scheduled for broadcast on July 4. A 25-minute original video animation titled "King of the Restaurant of Kings" was bundled with the official Blood Blockade Battlefront guidebook that was released on June 3, 2016. A second season aired from October 7 to December 24, 2017 and it ran for 12 episodes.

The series uses four musical themes: two openings and two ending theme songs. For season one, the opening is "Hello, World!" by Bump of Chicken while the ending is "Sugar Song to Bitter Step" by Unison Square Garden. For season two, the opening is  "Fake Town Baby" by Unison Square Garden while the ending is "Step Up Love." by Daoko and Yasuyuki Okamura.

Episode list

Blood Blockade Battlefront

Blood Blockade Battlefront & Beyond

Home video releases

Funimation released the complete series in blu-ray and DVD combo on August 16, 2016 in both standard and limited editions in North America.

References

Blood Blockade Battlefront